Thomasia is a mammaliaform from the family Haramiyidae. from the Late Triassic of Europe. 

Only its teeth have been found.

Distribution 
Fossils of the genus have been found in:
Triassic
 Sables and Grès de Mortinsart Formations, Gaume, Belgium
 Microlestes Quarry, Frome, England
 Exter and Trossingen Formations, Germany
 Auf dem Heftgen, Syren, Luxembourg
 Klettgau Formation, Switzerland
 Gres à Avicula contorta Formation, Franche-Comté and Lorraine, France

Jurassic
 Pant Fissure System 4, Pant Quarry, St Brides Major (community), Wales

References 

Haramiyida
Rhaetian life
Hettangian life
Prehistoric cynodont genera
Late Triassic synapsids of Europe
Early Jurassic synapsids of Europe
Jurassic England
Jurassic France
Jurassic Germany
Jurassic Switzerland
Fossils of Belgium
Fossils of England
Fossils of France
Fossils of Germany
Fossils of Luxembourg
Fossil taxa described in 1847